Morchard may refer to:

 Morchard, South Australia, a settlement
 Morchard Bishop, a small village in Mid-Devon, England
 Morchard Road, a small hamlet in Mid-Devon, England
 Cruwys Morchard, a historic estate in Mid-Devon, England